Daniela Chelsea Chatarina 'Dani' Karlsson  is a Swedish beauty pageant titleholder and model, who won Miss World Sweden 2010 and represented Sweden at Miss World 2010 on October 30 in China.  Karlsson was called in the same day as the pageant finale as one of the other contestants decided to back out of the pageant. Karlsson appeared in the music video for Darin Zanyar's  single Lovekiller.

References

External links 
Official blog of Dani Karlsson

Swedish beauty pageant winners
Living people
Swedish female models
Miss World 2010 delegates
Year of birth missing (living people)